Thiha Htet Aung (born 13 March 1996) is a footballer from Burma, and a defender for the Myanmar U-20 football team and Yangon United. He can play center back. He was born in Myanmar. He played striker position in Zeyar Shwe Myay. In 2015, Yangon United signed Thiha Htet Aung. He play in important role in Myanmar U 20 national team for 2015 FIFA U-20 World Cup in New Zealand.

International

Honours
Hassanal Bolkiah Trophy: 2014
2015 Myanmar National League: Champion

References

External links
 

1996 births
Living people
People from Rakhine State
Burmese footballers
Myanmar international footballers
Association football defenders
Yangon United F.C. players
Competitors at the 2017 Southeast Asian Games
Southeast Asian Games competitors for Myanmar